Maysk is a rural locality (a village) in Novotatyshlinsky Selsoviet, Tatyshlinsky District, Bashkortostan, Russia. The population was 76 as of 2010. There is 1 street.

Geography 
Maysk is located 15 km southeast of Verkhniye Tatyshly (the district's administrative centre) by road. Savkiyaz is the nearest rural locality.

References 

Rural localities in Tatyshlinsky District